Ethyl formate is an ester formed when ethanol (an alcohol) reacts with formic acid (a carboxylic acid). Ethyl formate has the characteristic smell of rum and is also partially responsible for the flavor of raspberries. It occurs naturally in the body of ants and in the stingers of bees.

Exposure
Ethyl formate is generally recognized as safe by the U.S. Food and Drug Administration.

According to the U.S Occupational Safety and Health Administration (OSHA), ethyl formate can irritate eyes, skin, mucous membranes, and the respiratory system of humans and other animals; it is also a central nervous system depressant.  In industry, it is used as a solvent for cellulose nitrate, cellulose acetate, oils, and greases.  It can be used as a substitute for acetone; workers may also be exposed to it under the following circumstances:
 during spray, brush, or dip applications of lacquers
 during the manufacture of safety glass
 when fumigating tobacco, cereals, and dried fruits (as an alternative to methyl bromide under the U.S. Department of Agriculture quarantine system)

OSHA considers a time-weighted average of 100 parts per million (300 milligrams per cubic meter) over an eight-hour period as the permissible exposure limit. The U.S. National Institute for Occupational Safety and Health (NIOSH) also considers a time-weighted average of 100 ppm over an eight-hour period as the recommended exposure limit.

In space
Ethyl formate has been identified in dust clouds in an area of the Milky Way galaxy called Sagittarius B2. It is among 50 molecular species identified using the 30 metre IRAM radiotelescope.

References

Ethyl esters
Formate esters